Martín de Espinosa y Monzó (1614–1676) was a Roman Catholic prelate who served as Bishop of Comayagua (1672–1676).

Biography
Martín de Espinosa y Monzó was born in Valladolid, México in 1614. On 12 September 1672, he was appointed during the papacy of Pope Clement X as Bishop of Comayagua. In 1673, he was consecrated bishop by Francisco Antonio Sarmiento de Luna y Enríquez, Bishop of Michoacán. He served as Bishop of Comayagua until his death in 1676.

References

External links and additional sources
 (for Chronology of Bishops) 
 (for Chronology of Bishops) 

17th-century Roman Catholic bishops in Honduras
Bishops appointed by Pope Clement X
1614 births
1676 deaths
Roman Catholic bishops of Comayagua